Zabrus hellenicus is a species of ground beetle in the Pterostichinae subfamily that is endemic to Greece.

Beetles described in 1883
Beetles of Europe
Endemic fauna of Greece
Zabrus